Baited remote underwater video (BRUV) is a system used in marine biology research. By attracting fish into the field of view of a remotely controlled camera, the technique records fish diversity, abundance and behaviour of species. Sites are sampled by video recording the region surrounding a baited canister which is lowered to the bottom from a surface vessel or less commonly by a submersible or remotely operated underwater vehicle. The video can be transmitted directly to the surface by cable, or recorded for later analysis.

 Anmol Singh Bedi Baited cameras are highly effective at attracting scavengers and subsequent predators, and are a non-invasive method of generating relative abundance indices for a number of marine species.

As a non-extractive technique, it offers a low environmental impact way of understanding changes in fish numbers and diversity over time. BRUV surveys were developed in Australia, and are now used around the world for a variety of projects. This is a low budget monitoring system that is less reliant on the availability of skilled labour and may make sustainable monitoring more practical, over the long term.

There are two main types of remote video technique which have been used to record reef fish populations. They can both be left free standing without the need of an operator. The first system uses one downward looking camera (D-BRUV), and the other uses either one (mono) or two (stereo) horizontally facing cameras (H-BRUV), and may use underwater lighting to illuminate the target area. Stereo BRUV recordings can use software analysis to determine the size of specimens.

The colour of the lighting used for video may influence behaviour of the target species.

References

Marine biology